Mount McGuire is a mountain located in the Sunwapta River Valley of Jasper National Park, in Alberta, Canada.

The mountain was named in 1971 after Fenton John Alexander "Mickey" McGuire, who served as a warden in the park for 34 years and ended his career as chief park warden.

References

Three-thousanders of Alberta
Winston Churchill Range
Mountains of Jasper National Park